Anostoma deshayesianum is a species of air-breathing land snail, a terrestrial pulmonate gastropod mollusc in the family Odontostomidae.

Distribution 
This species occurs in Brazil.

Shell description 
The shell of this species is orbiculate-globose, lightly striate, hardly shining, covered with a corneous epidermis. The shell is composed of 5 convex whorls. The spire is obtuse. The suture is hardly impressed, not marginate, bordered below by a blackish band. The last whorl is globose, not carinated, divided by a submedian blackish band above, the upper part having only a few spots near the periphery, the base with numerous brown spots arranged concentrically.

The shell aperture is semilunar and a little oblique. The columellar (parietal) margin is arcuate, convex, and three-toothed. The median tooth is the most strongly developed. The peristome is white, reflexed, and has six equidistant and equal white teeth, which are violet-tinted at their bases.

The width of adult shells is 33 mm, the height is 18 mm.

References
This article incorporates public domain text from reference.

External links 

Odontostomidae
Gastropods described in 1857